Sibley is an unincorporated community in Adams County, Mississippi, United States. There is a post office located on U.S. Route 61 in Sibley, ZIP code 39165.

Places
East of the hamlet are the "Sibley Oil Fields", and to the south is the  "Plantation Oaks Landfill", opened in 1991.

Notable people
Sibley is the birthplace of brothers Theodis, YZ, and Melwyn Ealey, whose musical achievements are acknowledged on a Mississippi Blues Trail marker in Natchez.

In popular culture
Sibley is mentioned in Peter Orner's award-winning novel Esther Stories.

Notes

Unincorporated communities in Adams County, Mississippi
Unincorporated communities in Mississippi
Unincorporated communities in Natchez micropolitan area